Qaleh Ostad (also Romanized as Qal‘eh Ostād) is a village in Atrak Rural District, Maneh District, Maneh and Samalqan County, North Khorasan Province, Iran. At the 2006 census, its population was 427, in 98 families.

References 

Populated places in Maneh and Samalqan County